Saint-Hilaire-du-Harcouët is a commune in the Manche department in Normandy in north-western France. On 1 January 2016, the former communes of Saint-Martin-de-Landelles and Virey were merged into Saint-Hilaire-du-Harcouët.

It is approximately 50 miles (80 km) east of St. Malo and a similar distance northeast of Rennes. A medieval tower in the town centre, the only remainder of the old church, contains frescos by painter Marthe Flandrin.

Geography

Climate
Saint-Hilaire-du-Harcouët has a oceanic climate (Köppen climate classification Cfb).

Population
The population data given in the table below refer to the commune in its geography as of January 2020.

Heraldry

See also
Communes of the Manche department

References

Sainthilaireduharcouet